Rebeca Pereira (born 23 March 1993) is a Brazilian tennis player.

Pereira has career-high WTA rankings of 949 in singles and 189 in doubles. She has won twelve ITF doubles titles in her career.

Pereira won her biggest title-to-date at the 2021 Kozerki Open where she won the doubles event, partnering Bárbara Gatica.

ITF Circuit finals

Doubles: 28 (12 titles, 16 runner-ups)

Notes

References

External links
 
 
 Rebeca Pereira at the University of North Florida

1993 births
Living people
Brazilian female tennis players
North Florida Ospreys women's tennis players
20th-century Brazilian women
21st-century Brazilian women